Peritrochia is an extinct genus of ammonite belonging to the order Goniatitida and family Vidrioceratidae. Specimens have been recovered from Permian beds in North America and East Timor.

References

Goniatitida